The Oasis on Lake Travis is a restaurant on the western edge of Austin, Texas. The restaurant promotes itself as the "Sunset Capital of Texas" with its terraced views looking West over Lake Travis. The thirty thousand-plus square foot restaurant sits on a bluff 450 feet above the lake and is the largest outdoor restaurant in the U.S.

The restaurant was first built in 1982 by Houston entrepreneur Beau Theriot, who purchased a  ranch overlooking the lake and converted it into the current multi-use venue.

On the morning of June 1, 2005, a lightning strike ignited a fire which consumed much of the property.  Parts of the facility that were not damaged were reopened within weeks, while other parts were rebuilt.

See also
 List of companies based in Austin, Texas

References

Further reading

External links
 Official website

Buildings and structures in Austin, Texas
Restaurants established in 1982
Companies based in Austin, Texas
Restaurants in Texas
1982 establishments in Texas